The  Fort Constantin (Fort Grand Duke Constantine,  Fort Konstantin)  was a coastal artillery battery  that covered southern waters of the fortified city of Kronstadt, Russia.  The city is located on the Kotlin Island, Gulf of Finland, Baltic Sea. Currently the fort has no military use, the structures are in disarray, and the transport and tourism company  tries to develop the territory as a tourist destination.

History
In 1807 Emperor Alexander I of Russia signed a decree to additionally fortify Kronstadt expecting a war with Great Britain. The construction started in 1808. The initial parapet of the battery was made of pine timber filled with sand and stone, for speed. It was made in two levels, hence the historical name "Double Southern Battery (Двойная Южная Батарея).

References

Further reading
Ткаченко, В. Ф., Амирханов, Л. И. (2007). Форт "Константин". Russia: Izdatelʹstvo Ostrov.
Леонид Амирханов (2022), Кронштадт. Город-крепость. От основания до наших дней
Леонид Амирханов,Ткаченко, В. Ф. (2004) Форты Кронштадта 

Forts in Russia
Buildings and structures in Saint Petersburg
Sea forts
1808 establishments in the Russian Empire
World Heritage Sites in Russia
Cultural heritage monuments of federal significance in Saint Petersburg